Lost in a Big City is a 1923 American silent drama film directed by George Irving and starring John Lowell, Charles Byer and Jane Thomas.

Cast
 John Lowell as Harry Farley
 Baby Ivy Ward as Florence
 Jane Thomas as Helen
 Charles Byer as Sidney Heaton / Richard Norman 
 Evangeline Russell as Blanche Maberly
 Edgar Keller as Salvatori
 Whitney Haley as Duboni
 Eddie Phillips as Trooper Ned Livingston 
 Ann Brody as Mrs. Leary
 Charles A. Robins as 'Raisin' Jackson
 Jimmy Phillips as Dick Watkins
 Charles Mackay as Simeon Maberly
 Jules Cowles as Jasper

References

Bibliography
 Munden, Kenneth White. The American Film Institute Catalog of Motion Pictures Produced in the United States, Part 1. University of California Press, 1997.

External links
 

1923 films
1923 drama films
1920s English-language films
American silent feature films
Silent American drama films
American black-and-white films
Films directed by George Irving
Arrow Film Corporation films
1920s American films